Cyril John Connell CBE (6 June 1899 – 25 October 1974) was an Australian university registrar and rugby league footballer and administrator. His son Cyril Connell Jr. also went on to become a successful rugby league footballer in his era.

Connell was born in Sydney, New South Wales and in his youth he fought in World War I, serving with the Australian Imperial Force in France.

After retiring from the football field Connell also served as an administrator for the Queensland Rugby League.

Connell's time as registrar of the University of Queensland is thought to have contributed significantly to the University's growth in the 1950s and 1960s. This earned him the honour of Commander (civil) of the Order of the British Empire in 1965.

In 2000 Connell was awarded the Australian Sports Medal for his contribution to Australia's international standing in rugby league.

References

External links
 Cyrill Connell at the Online Dictionary of Australian Biographies
Queensland Representatives at qrl.com.au

1899 births
1974 deaths
Australian Commanders of the Order of the British Empire
Australian military personnel of World War I
Australian rugby league players
Eastern Suburbs Tigers players
Fortitude Valley Diehards players
Queensland rugby league team players
Recipients of the Australian Sports Medal
Rugby league halfbacks
Rugby league players from Sydney
Academic staff of the University of Queensland